The Serbian Patriarchate of Peć (Srpska patrijaršija u Peći) or just Patriarchate of Peć (Pećka patrijaršija), was an autocephalous Eastern Orthodox Patriarchate that existed from 1346 to 1463, and then again from 1557 to 1766 with its seat in the Patriarchal Monastery of Peć. It had ecclesiastical jurisdiction over Eastern Orthodox Christians in Serbian Lands and other western regions of Southeastern Europe. Primates of the Patriarchate were styled Archbishop of Peć and Serbian Patriarch.

Medieval Period (1346–1463)

Since 1219, the Eastern Orthodox Church in the medieval Kingdom of Serbia was organized as an autocephalous Archbishopric seated at first in the Monastery of Žiča and since the middle of the 13th century in the Monastery of Peć. Political expansion of the Serbian medieval state culminated under the reign of King Stefan Dušan (1331–1355), who conquered many western provinces of the declining Byzantine Empire. Since 1334, the seat of the ancient Archbishopric of Ohrid was under Serbian rule, and by the autumn of 1345 Serbian forces completed the conquest of northern Greece, including the city of Serres, capital of eastern Macedonia and the seat of an important Metropolitanate. To mark the occasion, Stefan Dušan was proclaimed Emperor on December 25, 1345 (Christmas) in Serres.

Since it was customary for an emperor to be crowned by a patriarch, newly proclaimed Tsar Stefan Dušan decided to convoke a joint state and church assembly (sabor) that was held on April 16, 1346 (Easter) in the Serbian capital city of Skopje. This assembly was attended by Serbian Archbishop Joanikije II, Archbishop Nicholas I of Ohrid, Patriarch Simeon of Bulgaria and many other Hierarchs and Church dignitaries, including monastic leaders of Mount Athos. The assembly proclaimed the raising of the autocephalous Serbian Archbishopric to the rank of Patriarchate. The Archbishop of Peć was titled Serbian Patriarch, and his seat at the Monastery of Peć became the Patriarchal residence. On the same occasion, the newly proclaimed Serbian Patriarch Joanikije solemnly crowned Stefan Dušan as Emperor and autocrat of Serbs and Greeks.

The proclamation of the Patriarchate resulted in raising main bishoprics to the rank of honorary metropolitanates, starting with the bishopric of the city of Skopje that was raised to Metropolitanate of Skopje. The Patriarchate took over supreme ecclesiastical jurisdiction over Mount Athos and many Greek eparchies in Aegean Macedonia that were until then under the jurisdiction of the Ecumenical Patriarchate of Constantinople. The same process continued after the Serbian conquests of Thessaly, Epirus, Aetolia and Acarnania in 1347 and 1348. In the same time, the Ohrid Archbishopric remained autocephalous, recognizing the honorary primacy of the new Serbian Patriarchate.

Since proclamation of the Patriarchate was performed without consent of the Patriarchate of Constantinople, various canonical and political questions were raised. Supported by the Byzantine government, Patriarch Callistus I of Constantinople issued an act of condemnation and excommunication of Tsar Stefan Dušan and Serbian Patriarch Joanikije in 1350. That act created a rift between the Byzantine and Serbian churches, but not on dogmatic grounds, since the dispute was limited to the questions of ecclesiastical order and jurisdiction. Patriarch Joanikije died in 1354, and his successor Patriarch Sava IV (1354–1375) faced new challenges in 1371, when Turks defeated the Serbian army in the Battle of Marica and started their expansion into Serbian lands. Since they were facing the common enemy, the Serbian and Byzantine governments and church leaders reached an agreement in 1375. The act of excommunication was revoked and the Serbian Church was recognized as a Patriarchate, under the condition of returning all eparchies in contested southern regions to the jurisdiction of the Patriarchate of Constantinople.

After the new and decisive defeat by the Turks in the famous Battle of Kosovo in 1389, Serbia became a tributary state to the Ottoman Empire, and the Serbian Patriarchate was also affected by general social decline, since Ottoman Turks continued their expansion and raids into Serbian lands, devastating many monasteries and churches. The city of Skopje was taken by Turks in 1392, and all other southern regions were taken in 1395. That led to the gradual retreat of the jurisdiction of the Serbian Patriarchate in the south and expansion of the jurisdiction of the Archbishopric of Ohrid. Finally, in 1455, the city of Peć fell into Turkish hands. Soon after that, the Serbian capital of Smederevo also fell in 1459, marking the end of the main Serbian medieval state. Patriarch Arsenije II died in 1463, and the Serbian Patriarchate sank into the period of great decline.

Medieval eparchies of the Serbian Patriarchate of Peć

 Eparchy of Belgrade, also known as Eparchy of Mačva
 Eparchy of Braničevo, also known as Eparchy of Smederevo
 Eparchy of Budimlja, in the region of upper Polimlje
 Eparchy of Dabar, in the region of lower Polimlje
 Eparchy of Debar, in the valley of Black Drin
 Eparchy of Drama (contested with Patriarchate of Constantinople)
 Eparchy of Hum, also known as Eparchy of Lim
 Eparchy of Hvosno, in the region of northern Metohija
 Eparchy of Melnik (contested with Patriarchate of Constantinople)
 Eparchy of Moravica, also known as Eparchy of Arilje or Eparchy of Gradac
 Eparchy of Lipljan, also known as Eparchy of Gračanica or Eparchy of Novo Brdo
 Eparchy of Polog, also known as Eparchy of Tetovo
 Eparchy of Prizren, in the region of southern Metohija
 Eparchy of Ras, also known as Eparchy of Raška
 Eparchy of Serres (contested with Patriarchate of Constantinople)
 Eparchy of Skopje, ranked as first among eparchies
 Eparchy of Toplica, also known as Eparchy of Bela Crkva
 Eparchy of Velbužd, also known as Eparchy of Banja
 Eparchy of Zeta, also known as Eparchy of Cetinje
 Eparchy of Zletovo, also known as Eparchy of Lesnovo

Vacancy Period (1463–1557)

In the second half of the 15th century, the Ottoman Empire gradually conquered all Serbian lands, starting with the Serbian Despotate in 1459, followed by the conquest of the Bosnian Kingdom in 1463, Herzegovina in 1482, and finally Montenegro in 1496. All eparchies of the Serbian Patriarchate were devastated during Turkish raids, and many monasteries and churches were plundered and destroyed. Because of that, the period was remembered as "The Great Desolation" (ser. великое запустение). Although some Christian Serbs converted to Islam after the Turkish conquest, the vast majority continued their adherence to the Serbian Orthodox Church. On the other hand, the structure of the Serbian Patriarchate was deeply disrupted. After the death of Patriarch Arsenije II in 1463, the question of succession was opened. Since sources are silent, historians concluded that the period of vacancy was prolonged, resulting in de facto abolition of the Patriarchal office.

In the same time, the jurisdiction of the Archbishopric of Ohrid continued to expand towards northern Serbian eparchies until it finally took over the entire territory of the Serbian Patriarchate. That situation was not acceptable for Serbian church leaders who wanted to restore previous Church order. Shortly after the Turkish conquest of Belgrade in 1521 and victory in the Battle of Mohacs in 1526, Serbian Metropolitan Pavle of Smederevo made a series of attempts to restore the Serbian Patriarchate, and for a short time managed to seize the throne of Peć, proclaiming himself to be the new Archbishop of Peć and Serbian Patriarch. By 1541, his movement was crushed by joint forces of the Archbishopric of Ohrid and the Patriarchate of Constantinople. In spite of that, Serbian Church leaders continued to hope for a new chance to renew their old Patriarchate.

Early Modern Period (1557–1766)

Serbian Patriarchate of Peć was finally restored in 1557 thanks to the mediation of some highly influential dignitaries in Turkish Court. During the second half of the reign of Turkish Sultan Suleiman I (1520–1566), one of the most notable Ottoman statesmen was pasha Mehmed Sokolović, who served as one of the Viziers since 1555 and later became Grand Vizier (1565–1579). By birth, he was an Orthodox Serb, taken from his family as a boy under the rule of Devşirme and converted into Islam. In spite of that, he later restored ties with his family, and in 1557 his cousin Makarije, one of the Serbian Orthodox bishops, was elected the new Serbian Patriarch of Peć.

The full restoration of the old Patriarchate was of great importance for the Orthodox Serbs because it enabled them to reorganize and improve their spiritual and cultural life under the Ottoman rule. Territorial jurisdiction of the Patriarchate was expanded towards northern and western regions, with more than 40 eparchies, from Skopje to the south, to the Eparchy of Buda to the north. Among new eparchies in western and northern regions were: the Eparchy of Požega in lower Slavonia, the Eparchy of Bačka between Danube and Tisza, and the eparchies of Vršac and Temesvár in the region of Banat. One of the largest eparchies by territory was the Eparchy of Dabar-Bosnia, which had jurisdiction from the region of upper Drina throughout central and western Bosnia, up to the borders of Venetian Dalmatia and the Habsburg Military Frontier. The newly restored Serbian Patriarchate also included some eparchies in western Bulgaria. The basic title of its primate was Archbishop of Peć and Serbian Patriarch, although extended patriarchal titles sometimes included not only Serbs, but also Bulgarians, and various regions in western parts of the Southeastern Europe.

For Christian Serbs in Ottoman Empire, the renewed Serbian Patriarchate was a religious and national symbol that substituted for their long-lost state. Therefore, the Patriarchate could not stand aside of political events and some of its leaders participated in local uprisings against Turkish rule. In the time of Serbian Patriarch Jovan Kantul (1592–1614), the Ottoman Turks took the remains of first Serbian Archbishop Saint Sava from the monastery of Mileševa to the Vračar hill in Belgrade, where they were burned by Sinan Pasha on a stake to intimidate the Serbs in the time of the Banat Uprising (1594). The present-day Temple of Saint Sava in Belgrade was later built on the place where his remains were burned.

According to British historian Frederick Anscombe, who praised works of Noel Malcolm on the history of Kosovo, there was "no ethnic monopoly on appointment to supposedly national church positions" in the Patriarchate of Peć and the Archbishopric of Ohrid. He also added that those ecclesiastical institutions "had no ethnic nature at that time, neither formally, nor in practice" and therefore placed "Serbian" and "Bulgarian" names in brackets.

The turning point in the history of the Serbian Patriarchate was marked by the events of the Austro-Turkish war (1683–1699). During the war years, relations between Muslims and Christians in European provinces of the Turkish Empire were greatly radicalized. As a result of Turkish oppression, destruction of monasteries and violence against the non-Muslim civilian population, Serbian Christians and their church leaders headed by Serbian Patriarch Arsenije III sided with Austrians in 1689 and again in 1737 under Serbian Patriarch Arsenije IV. In the following punitive campaigns, Turkish armies conducted many atrocities against local Christian populations in Serbian regions, resulting in Great Migrations of the Serbs.

Since northern parts of the Patriarchate came under the rule of the Habsburg monarchy during the war (1683–1699), Serbian eparchies in those regions were reorganized into the autonomous Metropolitanate of Krušedol (1708) that remained under supreme ecclesiastical jurisdiction of the Serbian Patriarchate. In 1713, the seat of the Metropolitanate was moved to Sremski Karlovci.

Consequent Serbian uprisings against the Turks and involvement of Serbian Patriarchs in anti-Ottoman activities, led to the political compromise of the Patriarchate in the eyes of the Turkish political elite. Instead of Serbian bishops, Turkish authorities favored politically more reliable Greek bishops who were promoted to Serbian eparchies and even to the Patriarchal throne in Peć. In the same time, after 1752 a series of internal conflicts arose among leading figures in the Serbian Patriarchate, resulting in constant fights between Serbian and Greek pretenders to the Patriarchal throne. Finally, the Serbian Patriarchate of Peć collapsed in 1766, when it was abolished by the Turkish Sultan Mustafa III (1757–1774). The entire territory of the Serbian Patriarchate under Ottoman rule was placed under the jurisdiction of the Ecumenical Patriarchate of Constantinople. The throne of Peć was suppressed and eleven remaining Serbian eparchies were transferred to the throne of Constantinople.

Those eparchies were:

 Eparchy of Belgrade,
 Eparchy of Dabar-Bosnia,
 Eparchy of Herzegovina,
 Eparchy of Kyustendil,
 Eparchy of Niš,
 Eparchy of Prizren,
 Eparchy of Raška,
 Eparchy of Samokov,
 Eparchy of Skopje,
 Eparchy of Užice,
 Eparchy of Zvornik.

See also
Serbian Orthodox Church
List of heads of Serbian Orthodox Church

Notes

References

Sources

External links

Official website of the Serbian Orthodox Church

Patriarchate of Peć
History of the Serbian Orthodox Church